Ross Taylor is a cricketer who represents the New Zealand national cricket team. He has scored 19 centuries (100 or more runs in a single innings) in Test and 21 in One Day International (ODI) matches. Taylor made his Test debut against South Africa at New Wanderers Stadium, Johannesburg, in November 2007. His first century came four months later against England at the Seddon Park, Hamilton. His highest score of 290 came against Australia at the WACA Ground, Perth in 2015. Taylor has scored Test centuries at ten cricket grounds, including seven at venues outside New Zealand. He has scored his nineteen Test centuries against eight different opponents and most of his centuries (four) have come against the West Indies.

Taylor made his ODI debut in March 2006 against West Indies at McLean Park, Napier. His first century came in December 2006 against Sri Lanka at the same ground; he scored 128 not out in the match which New Zealand lost by seven wickets. His highest ODI score of 181 not out came against England at the University Oval in March 2018. Taylor's 102 not out (off 70 balls) against Pakistan in February 2015 is the fifth-fastest century by a New Zealander in ODIs. He has not scored any centuries in Twenty20 International (T20I) matches. , Taylor is joint 16th in the list of century-makers in international cricket with 40, and the highest ranked New Zealander.

Key

Test centuries

One Day International centuries

References

External links
 

Taylor
Taylor, Ross